A Stranger in Mayfair, by Charles Finch, is a mystery set in Mayfair and surrounding neighborhoods in London, England during the Victorian era.  It is the fourth novel in the Charles Lenox series.

Plot summary

Charles Lenox, gentleman amateur detective, has recently married and has been elected to Parliament.  Although Lenox plans to give up detection (due to the demands of his new vocation and to alleviate the concerns of his new wife), he is pulled into a case when a colleague in Parliament asks for help solving the murder of his footman.

Publication history
A Stranger in Mayfair was first published in hardcover by St. Martin’s Minotaur and released on November 9, 2010.  A large print edition was published by Center Point Publishing in June 2011.  The trade paperback was released in July 2011.

See also
 London in fiction

References

External links
 A Stranger in Mayfair Official Macmillan Page
 Review by USA Today
 Review by The Library Journal

2010 American novels
American mystery novels
Novels set in London
City of Westminster
Novels set in Victorian England
Novels by Charles Finch
Charles Lenox novels
St. Martin's Press books